is a passenger railway station located in the city of Miyoshi, Tokushima Prefecture, Japan. It is operated by JR Shikoku and has the station number "D20".

Lines
Only local trains stop at the station.

Layout
The station consists of two side platforms serving two tracks. An unstaffed station building connected to one of the side platforms serves as a waiting room. An overhead footbridge gives access to the other platform.

Platforms

Adjacent stations

History
At this time the line was known as the Sanyo Line and was operated by Japanese Government Railways (JGR) which was later corporatised as Japanese National Railways (JNR). With the privatization of JNR on 1 April 1987, control of the station passed to JR Shikoku.

Surrounding area
National Route 32 - runs parallel to the track.
Hashikura-ji Temple - a Buddhist temple at the summit of Mount Hashikura and accessible by the Hashikurasan Ropeway.

See also
 List of Railway Stations in Japan

References

External links

 JR Shikoku timetable

Railway stations in Tokushima Prefecture
Railway stations in Japan opened in 1929
Miyoshi, Tokushima